Filimonov (masculine) or Filimonova (feminine) is a Russian surname, and means literally Philemon's. It is shared by the following people:
Aleksandr Filimonov (Alexander Filimonov), Russian association football player
Alexander Filimonov (Cossack) (1866–1948), Russian Cossack
Andrei Filimonov (Andrey Filimonov), Russian association football player
Dmitri Filimonov (Dmitry Filimonov), Russian ice hockey player
Gennadi Filimonov (Gennady Filimonov), Russian association football player
Lyudmila Filimonova, Belarusian discus thrower
Sergey Filimonov, Kazakhstani weightlifter
Vladimir Filimonov, Russian association football player

Russian-language surnames
Patronymic surnames
Surnames from given names